Artamonov (masculine) or Artamonova (feminine) may refer to:

Fiction
The Artamonov Business, a 1925 novel by Maxim Gorky 
The Artamonov Business (film), a 1941 film based on the novel

People 
Alexei Artamonov (1916–1941), Soviet pilot and Hero of the Soviet Union
Anatoly Dmitriyevich Artamonov (b. 1952), Governor of Kaluga Oblast, Russia
Inga Artamonova (1936–1966), Soviet speed skater, the first four-time Allround World Champion in women's speed skating history
Leonid Artamonov (1859-1932), Russian military engineer, general, writer, geographer and explorer
Mikhail Artamonov (1898–1972), Soviet historian and archaeologist
Nikolay Artamonov (1906–1965), Soviet rocket scientist
Artamonov (crater), lunar crater named after him
Yevgeniya Artamonova (born 1975), Russian volleyball player, who was a member of the Olympic medal winning national team
Catena Artamonov, chain of craters on the Moon located near Artamonov crater
Artamonov (Russian nobility) noble family of Scottish origin. Descents of Ivan Denisov son Artmanov, first in the service of the Polish–Lithuanian Commonwealth later a soldier in Russian service. Pomeschik in Vologda.
 (1840—1918), military geodesist, member of Russian Astronomical Society, Chief of the Corps of Military Topographers of the Russian Imperial Army
Valentina Artamonova (born 1960), Russian politician

References

Russian-language surnames